Batara Kala is the god of the underworld in traditional Javanese and Balinese mythology, ruling over it in a cave along with Setesuyara. Batara Kala is also named the creator of light and the earth. He is also the god of time and destruction, who devours unlucky people. He is related to Hindu concept of Kala, or time. In mythology, he causes eclipses by trying to eat the Sun or the Moon.

Origin myth 

According to legend, Batara Kala is the son of Batara Guru (the Javanese version of Shiva). Batara Guru has a very beautiful wife named Dewi Uma (Parvati). One day Batara Guru, in a fit of uncontrolled lust, forced himself on Dewi Uma. They had sexual intercourse on top of his vahana Nandi, a divine cow. This behavior ashamed Uma, who cursed both of them so they appeared as fearsome and ugly ogres. This fierce form of Dewi Uma is also known in Hinduism as Durga. From this relationship, Batara Kala was born with the appearance of an ogre.

Another origin story is that he was conceived when a drop of Shiva's semen was swallowed by a fish.

Batara Kala is described as having an insatiable appetite and being very rude. He was sent by the devas to Earth to punish humans for their evil habits. However, Batara Kala was interested only in devouring humans to satisfy his appetite. Alarmed, the devas then recalled Batara Kala from the Earth. He later became ruler of the underworld, together with the goddess Setesuyara.

Traditionally, Javanese people try to obtain his favor, as the god of time and destruction, to prevent misfortune, especially to children. Exorcism ceremonies, called ruwatan, are held for children born under "unlucky" circumstances, such as being born feet-first. This is to prevent such children from being devoured by Batara Kala. This ceremony usually includes a wayang (Javanese shadow puppets) performance and a selamatan feast.

Eclipse myth 

In Javanese mythology, Batara Kala is the cause of the solar and lunar eclipses. As the god of darkness and the underworld, Batara Kala is the sworn enemy of the god of the Moon, Batara Candra and god of the Sun, Batara Surya. Sometimes he will try to devour the Sun or Moon, causing an eclipse. When this eclipse happens, Javanese villagers will try to save the Sun or Moon by offering sacrifices and banging lesung (traditional rice hulling equipment) or slit drums, to cause noise and make Batara Kala vomit. This is thought to release the Sun or Moon and stop the eclipse.

Symbolism
Simon Monbaron notes that Batara Kala symbolizes the negative effects of having sexual relations in a fit of passion. Batara Kala's negative aspects are described as a warning against the fate of all children born out of wedlock. Batara Kala's function, especially as a Kirtimukha, has been considered similar to Bhoma in Indian and Balinese Hinduism.

References 

Balinese mythology
Death gods
Creator gods
Underworld gods
Indonesian gods